Amazing Stories is the debut studio album by Australian blues-rock band The Revelators. The album was released in 1991 and consisted of cover versions of soul and blues songs. 
The album was re-released in March 1993 as a 2CD pack with The Black Sorrows' Better Times and peaked at number 14 on the ARIA Chart.
The album was re-released in 2002 with two additional tracks from the original sessions that were not included on the first pressing, Those being "Honest I Do" and "Tonight The Bottle Let Me Down"

Inside the booklet, Joe Camilleri of The Revelators said: "I don't see this as a greatest hits recording, more an opportunity to pay homage to some of the great writers of our time.The Revelators were formed out of a desire to keep music alive. Some of these songs have been with us for some time - others we were drawn to because of their charm... and every word is true."

Track listing 
 CD track listing

 2002 Re-release 
 "El Salvador"
 "Oh Darling"
 "Do Right Woman"
 "I've Got to Find a Way to Win Maria Back"
 "Tupelo Honey"
 "What Does It Take (To Win Your Love)?"
 "Caribbean Wind"
 "Honest I Do" (John Scofield) - 3:05
 "Hot Burrito #1"
 "If I Could Be There"
 "Louisiana Blues"
 "Tonight the Bottle Let Me Down" (Merle Haggard) - 3:27
 "Walk That Line"

Weekly charts
Upon re-release with The Black Sorrows' Better Times, the album debuted at number 41, before peaking at number 14 on the ARIA charts in May 1993.

Personnel
The Revelators are:
 Joe Camilleri - vocal, saxophone, guitar
 James Black - keyboard, guitar
 Jeff Burstin - guitar, mandolin
 Joe Creighton - bass, backing vocals
 Peter Luscombe - drums, percussion

Release history

References

External links
 "Amazing Stories" at discogs.com

1991 debut albums
The Revelators albums
Albums produced by Joe Camilleri